Live It Out is the second album released by the Canadian indie rock band Metric. It was released on September 27, 2005, on Last Gang Records. The album has sold 45,000 copies in the US, and went platinum in Canada selling 100,000 units.

Live It Out was shortlisted for the 2006 Polaris Music Prize and nominated for "Alternative Album of the Year" at Juno Awards 2006. The album was also chosen as one of Amazon.com's Top 100 Editor's Picks of 2005 and the 38th best album of 2006 by NME.

There were three singles (and videos) released from the album: "Monster Hospital", "Poster of a Girl" and "Empty". "Handshakes" was a radio promo, released only in Canada.

Track listing

Personnel
Emily Haines – vocals, synthesizers
James Shaw – guitar, vocals, producer
Joshua Winstead – bass guitar
Joules Scott-Key – drums

Charts

References

2005 albums
Metric (band) albums
Last Gang Records albums
Albums recorded at Metalworks Studios